Bangladesh–Namibia relations refer to the bilateral relations between Bangladesh and Namibia. Both the countries enjoy friendly bilateral relations between each other and have been trying to strengthen it further. Neither country has a resident ambassador.

Social development 
Bangladesh and Namibia have shown interest to cooperate with each other for the social development of both the countries. Bangladesh has expressed its intent to help Namibia in fighting various health hazards, including HIV/AIDS, using its pharmaceutical technology. Bangladesh has also invited Namibia to recruit skilled doctors and engineers from Bangladesh who would work for the social development of Namibia.

Economic cooperation 
Bangladesh and Namibia are keen to expand the bilateral economic activities between the two countries with both the countries undertaking necessary measures in this regard. Bangladeshi jute goods, leather goods, ceramics and pharmaceuticals have been identified as potential products in the Namibian market.

See also  
 Foreign relations of Bangladesh
 Foreign relations of Namibia

References 

Namibia
Bilateral relations of Namibia
Namibia
Bangladesh